The 2016 Uber Cup qualification process is a series of tournaments organised by the five BWF confederations to decide 15 of the 16 teams which will play in the 2016 Uber Cup, with China qualifying automatically both as hosts, and trophy holder.

Qualified teams

Qualification process
The number of teams participating in the final tournament is 16. The allocation of slots for each confederation is 4 from each Asia and Europe, and 1 from each Africa, Oceania and Pan Am. Two automatic qualifiers are the host and defending champion. The remaining quota will be filled by World Team Ranking.

Confederation qualification

Badminton Confederation of Africa

The qualification for the African teams was held from 16 to 19 February 2016, at the National Badminton Centre in Rose Hill, Mauritius. The winners of the African qualification will qualified for the Uber Cup.

Teams in contention
Teams qualified for the Group stage

First round (group stage)

Second round (knockout stage)

Badminton Asia

The qualification for the Asian teams was held from 15 to 21 February 2016, at the GMC Balayogi Indoor Stadium in Hyderabad, India. The semi-finalist of the Asian qualification will qualified for the Uber Cup. China qualifying automatically as hosts and trophy holder.

Teams in contention
Teams qualified for the Group stage

 (qualified)

First round (group stage)

Second round (knockout stage)

Badminton Europe

The qualification for the European teams was held from 15 to 21 February 2016, at the Kazan Gymnastics Center in Kazan, Russia. The semi-finalist of the European qualification will qualified for the Uber Cup.

Teams in contention
Teams qualified for the Group stage

First round (group stage)

Ranking of runners-up

Second round (knockout stage)

Badminton Oceania

The qualification for the Pan Am teams was held from 19 to 20 February 2016, at the X-TRM North Harbour Centre in Auckland, New Zealand. The winner of the Oceania qualification will qualified for the Uber Cup.

Teams in contention
Teams qualified for the Group stage

Round-robin

Badminton Pan Am

The qualification for the Pan Am teams was held from 17 to 20 February 2016, at the CODE II Jalisco in Guadalajara, Mexico. The winner of the Pan Am qualification will qualified for the Uber Cup.

Teams in contention
Teams qualified for the Group stage

First round (group stage)

Second round (final)

|-

|}

World team rankings 
Below is the chart of the BWF World Team Ranking calculated by adding World Ranking of top three Women's Singles players and top two Women's Doubles pairs on 3 March 2016.

References

qualification